Tracks of Glory is a 1992 Australian mini series set in 1903 about Major Taylor's visit to Australia and his rivalry with Australian cycler Don Walker.

The budget was around $5 million. The script was based on a book Major Taylor Down Under by Jim Fitzpatrick.

References

External links

Review at Filmink magazine

1990s Australian television miniseries
1992 Australian television series debuts
1992 Australian television series endings